Vi som aldrig landat is a 2004 Patrik Isaksson studio album.

Track listing
1985
En chans till
Vi som aldrig landat
Innan dagen gryr
Kom med mig hem
Det kunde varit jag
Min tur
Balladen om ensamhet
Som på film
Låtsasvärld
Slå sig fri
Sommarrush

Charts

References

External links

2004 albums
Patrik Isaksson (singer) albums
Swedish-language albums